The Archdeacon of Wells has been a senior clergy position in the Church of England Diocese of Bath and Wells sin the English reformation, before which it was part of the Roman Catholic Church. The post, having oversight over the archdeaconry of Wells in Somerset has existed since the twelfth century. The archdeaconry includes seven deaneries.

List of archdeacons

High Medieval
Archdeacons without territorial titles:
bef. 1086–aft. 1088: Benselin, Archdeacon of Exon
bef. 1106–aft. 1106: Walkerius
bef. 1106–aft. 1106: Robert
bef. 1120–aft. 1136: Arald
bef. 1122–bef. 1136: John de Bada (son of Hildebert)
Archdeacons of Wells:
bef. 1142–aft. 1151: Eustace
bef. 1159–aft. 1166: Robert
bef. 1168–aft. 1194: Thomas of Earley (Erlegh) alias Agnellus
bef. 1198–aft. 1199: Simon of Wells (later Bishop of Chichester)
bef. 1204–1209 (res.): Hugh of Wells (became Bishop of Lincoln)
bef. 1215–aft. 1231: William of Bardney
bef. 1238–1248 (res.): William of Bitton (uncle; became Bishop of Bath and Wells)
aft. 1248–bef. 1249 (res.): John of Bitton
bef. 1249–aft. 1254: Peter Chaceporc
bef. 1263–1267 (res.): William of Bitton (nephew) (became Bishop of Bath and Wells)
1267–1268 (res.): Godfrey Giffard (also Archdeacon of Barnstaple until May 1267; also Archdeacon of York from 1267; became Bishop of Worcester)
bef. 1269–aft. 1269: S. (i.e. either Simon de Micham or Stephen of Chichester)
bef. 1270–1284 (res.): Thomas Bytton (became Dean of Wells)
bef. 1286–aft. 1295: Walter Haselshaw (later Dean of Wells)
bef. 1295–24 January 1303 (d.): Peter de Insula (previously Archdeacon of Exeter)

Late Medieval
aft. 1303–24 May 1326 (res.): Thomas de Charlton
24 May–13 June 1326 (exch.): Wibert de Lutleton
13 June 1326–bef. 1334: Robert de Wamberg (bishop's candidate; admitted but disputed by king's candidates)
29 June 1329 – 1330: Simon de Montacute (royal grant; never admitted)
15 October 1330 – 1332: Thomas Upton (royal grant; never admitted)
bef. 1334–aft. 1336: Robert Mortimer
bef. 1344–aft. 1344: Hugh
bef. 1346–1352 (res.): Thomas Fastolf (became Bishop of St David's)
3 January 1353 – 12 June 1361 (d.): William de Court 
27 October 1361–bef. 1369 (res.): Étienne Cardinal Aubert (Cardinal-deacon of Santa Maria in Aquiro)
21 February 1369 – 22 July 1376 (d.): Simon Cardinal Langham  (former archbishop of Canterbury; cardinal-priest of San Sisto Vecchio until 1373, then Cardinal-Bishop of Palestrina; also Archdeacon of York from 1374)
bef. 1385–aft. 1388: Andrew Baret
1386–aft. 1391: John de Rypon (royal grant)
13 September 1388: John Beer (unsuccessful royal grant)
6 June 1391: Thomas Tuttebury (unsuccessful royal grant; became Dean of Wells)
28 August 1391 – 4 May 1398 (exch.): Nicholas Slake
4 May 1398–bef. 1419 (d.): John Ikelyngton
13 April 1419–bef. 1449 (d.): Thomas Bubwith
15 April 1450 – 1 April 1470 (d.): Andrew Holes
bef. 1471–bef. 1473 (d.): Thomas Bridlington
12 April 1473–bef. 1494 (res.): William Nykke
10 July 1494 – 1500 (res.): Richard Nykke (became Bishop of Norwich)
30 December 1500–bef. 1502 (res.): François de Busleyden, Archbishop of Besançon
19 November 1502 – 1507 (d.): Thomas Beaumont (previously Archdeacon of Bath)
1 January 1508 – 26 December 1546 (res.): Polydore Vergil (also called Castellensis)

Early modern
Archdeaconry resigned to the crown and abolished, 1547.
bef. 1547–aft. 1554: Vergil still called Archdeacon of Wells
bef. 1554–?: Cotterell already called Archdeacon of Wells
Archdeaconry re-erected, 1556.
bef. 1559–1572 (d.): John Cotterell
bef. 1572–bef. 1582 (d.): John Rugge
March 1582–?: Bartholomew Clerke (a layman)
4 February 1589–aft. 1605: John Langworth
1611–aft. 1645: Gerard Wood
1645–bef. 1649: William Watts (never took possession)
1660–27 April 1680 (d.): Grindal Sheafe
28 April 1680 – 1683 (d.): Charles Thirlby
10 November 1683 – 8 October 1705 (d.): Edwin Sandys
11 October 1705 – 7 March 1716 (d.): Samuel Hill
4 May 1716 – 24 November 1726 (d.): Henry Layng
7 December 1726 – 1 October 1739 (d.): Edmund Archer (previously Archdeacon of Taunton)
26 November 1739 – 14 November 1742 (d.): John Wicksted
24 November 1742 – 20 April 1749 (d.): George Shakerley
19 August 1749 – 7 November 1757 (d.): Edmund Aubery
26 April 1758 – 26 February 1760 (d.): Lionel Seaman (previously Archdeacon of Taunton)
9 August 1760 – 1 October 1767 (d.): Francis Potter (previously Archdeacon of Taunton)
20 October 1767 – 12 May 1815 (d.): William Willes (previously Archdeacon of Taunton)
7 July 1815 – 5 April 1826 (d.): Charles Sandiford
4 October 1826 – 1862 (res.): Henry Law (became Dean of Gloucester)

Late modern
1862–?: Fitzhardinge Portman (died 1893)
April 1863–24 December 1897 (d.): Augustus Otway Fitzgerald, Rector of Charlton Mackrell (St Mary) until 1876, then Vicar of Brent Knoll
March 1898–20 September 1899 (d.): Edwin Arthur Salmon, Vicar of Brent Knoll
1899–1 May 1917 (d.): Frederick Brymer, Rector of Charlton Mackrell (St Mary)
1917–19 December 1934 (d.): Walter Farrer, Vicar of St Cuthbert's, Wells until 1919
1935–1940 (res.): George Hollis, Bishop suffragan of Taunton
1940–1951 (ret.): Walter Norman Higgins, Rector of Mells until 1944
1951–1962 (ret.): Harold Bryant Salmon
1963–1973 (ret.): John Lance
1974–1982 (res.): Peter Haynes (became Dean of Hereford)
1983–1993 (ret.): Ted Thomas
1993–2003 (ret.): Richard Acworth
2003–2006: Peter Maurice (became Bishop suffragan of Taunton)
April 200717 September 2016 (res.): Nicola Sullivan (became Dean of Southwell)
5 September 201620 May 2017: Kevin Roberts (Acting)
20 May 2017present: Anne Gell

Notes

References

Sources

Lists of Anglicans
 
Lists of English people